The BH Tennis Open International Cup is a professional tennis tournament played on outdoor hard courts. It is currently part of the ATP Challenger Tour. It is held annually in Belo Horizonte, Brazil, since 1992.

Past finals

Singles

Doubles

External links
Official website
ITF Search

 
ATP Challenger Tour
Hard court tennis tournaments
Tennis tournaments in Brazil